The Northern Lights Express (NLX) is a planned higher-speed rail service that would run  between Minneapolis and Duluth primarily in the U.S. state of Minnesota. A portion of the proposed line would run through neighboring Wisconsin to serve Duluth's "Twin Port" of Superior. The train service is said to provide an alternative to traveling Interstate 35 between Duluth and the Twin Cities or to other destinations along the line such as the casino in Hinckley.

The proposed service's trains would mostly follow the same route as Amtrak's former North Star, except that it would originate in Minneapolis rather than neighboring Saint Paul, and it is planned to stop at a suburban Twin Cities station (probably constructed at Metro Transit's Foley Boulevard bus station).  The proposed route follows part of the Northstar commuter rail route which opened in 2009, and would contain the entirety of the proposed Bethel Corridor commuter route, although that service is not expected to be operational by the time recent estimates of when NLX might open.

History
The Northern Lights Express would be the first passenger rail service to Duluth since 1986, when Amtrak discontinued the  North Star.  Alternatives analysis and a corridor assessment report were complete as of summer 2010.  The line had initially been projected to open as early as 2012, though more recent sources had stated 2013 or 2014 as start dates.  As of 2010, the project was entering either an 18-month Environmental Impact Statement (EIS) process or a shorter Environmental Assessment (EA) review, but it was unclear which path was to be taken.  The shorter EA process was strongly advocated by former Rep. James Oberstar, former chairman of the U.S. House Transportation Committee, who represented northern Minnesota.

Discussion about the Northern Lights Express dates back at least a decade.  A preliminary feasibility study was conducted around the year 2000, followed by a comprehensive feasibility study in 2006–2007.  A joint powers board was established in 2007 consisting of the regional rail authorities for counties along the corridor along with representatives from Minneapolis, Duluth, and the Mille Lacs Band of Ojibwe. The name was given to the line in March 2008 by a vote of the corridor's stakeholders.

The  option was discarded because it wouldn't attract enough riders to cover operating costs. NLX supporters hope to receive funds from the Federal Railroad Administration which requires new train projects to show they will operate at a surplus each year, unlike the Federal Transit Administration that funded the Hiawatha and Northstar lines in the Twin Cities. The study used the diesel-powered Talgo XXI as a reference, which has poor acceleration above .

Planning for the line received a big boost at the end of September 2008 when U.S. Transportation Secretary Mary Peters announced that the federal government would contribute $30 million to passenger rail projects across the country.  The contribution included $1.1 million for the Northern Lights Express. On September 9, 2011, Transportation Secretary Ray LaHood announced a grant of $5 million to fund environmental and engineering studies for the project. On March 18, 2013, the Environmental Assessment was completed and released on the Minnesota Department of Transportation website.

In 2015 a press conference revealed an updated look at the NLX plan. This proposal included 6 stations served by 4 daily trains in each direction. Tier 2 studies of the line would continue until 2017. As of June 2019, the project had failed to secure funding. However in February 2020, a proposal was made to grant $40 million in funding for the project.

Early 2022 saw momentum to acquire funding for the line. As part of the proposed 2022 state bonding bill, Governor Tim Walz earmarked $16.1 million for safety, capacity, and infrastructure improvements in the corridor, and if passed would receive a federal match of $80 million. Supporters have pointed out that Northern Lights Express would be eligible for funds appointed to Amtrak–State projects under the Infrastructure Investment and Jobs Act, with Northern Lights Express able to receive priority as a shovel ready project. Representatives Mary Murphy and Liz Olson co-sponsored two bills in the Minnesota House that would allocate $85 million for the project, activating the remaining $320 million from the Department of Transportation. Senator Jerry Newton announced they would sponsor companion bills in the Minnesota Senate.

Required track improvements
The Northern Lights Express is planned to use several segments of BNSF track.  Starting from the south, it would run along the Wayzata Subdivision from Target Field to Minneapolis Junction, the Midway Subdivision to Northtown Yard, and then enter the Staples Subdivision—the same as the current Northstar commuter line.  However, the NLX would turn north at Coon Creek Junction in Coon Rapids to enter the Hinckley Subdivision, which it would follow to Boylston Junction between Foxboro and Superior, Wisconsin.  From Boylston, the train would use BNSF's Lakes Subdivision to reach Superior. From Superior to Duluth, the train would be on BNSF again, crossing the Grassy Point swing bridge back into Minnesota and then turning northeast to travel along the shore of St. Louis Bay. The train would exit BNSF rails at Rice's Point and would then run along the North Shore Scenic Railroad for a short segment into the Duluth Union Depot.
 
A preliminary study from around the year 2000 projected a cost of $79 million to purchase rolling stock and upgrade track along the existing line, though this apparently only anticipated  service. The cost projection grew to $320 million in 2008, and $615 million in 2009, with a "worst-case scenario" number of $990 million. The latest budget as of 2017 is around $425 million.  "Construction costs include final design work, track and signal upgrades to accommodate higher speeds, new and longer sidings to improve traffic flow, grade crossing improvements to increase safety, new train stations, and the expansion of existing stations". Up to 80% of the cost may be covered by the federal government, only requiring 20% from state and local sources.  This is comparable to highway projects which often receive 80% or 90% funding from the federal government, and is in contrast to the Hiawatha light rail and Northstar commuter lines which received 50% matching federal funds.

The wide range of cost estimates relates to how much of the  line between Coon Creek Junction and Duluth would need to be upgraded from the current single-track configuration to a double-track corridor. Running double track all the way to Duluth may bring the cost to $990 million, but the NLX organization has preferred to only run double track north to Sandstone. It was also considered key to upgrade the rails to let trains make the trip in two hours or less. At that pace, the trains could do more than one round trip per day, reducing the number of trainsets needed to provide frequent service. This would significantly reduce the cost and lead to better benefit-cost calculations, but would also reduce the operating margin to barely better than break-even. This still compares favorably with the scheduled 3 hours 35 minutes scheduled for the North Star in 1985—a mere  average.

, the line hosted 12 to 15 freight trains per day. There are more than 150 grade crossings and 12 bridges on this segment which would need to be improved (or eliminated, in the case of some grade crossings). The line has automatic block signaling, but needs centralized traffic control and positive train control installed to support speeds above . There are also several sidings along the route which only have manual switches and would need to be automated.

The double-track main line south of Coon Creek Junction is the busiest rail corridor in the Twin Cities metropolitan area.  In July 2009, before the Northstar commuter line began operation, this segment hosted 63 trains per day.  There are already plans for BNSF to construct a third main line in the area from the junction south to East Interstate (the bridge over Interstate 694).  BNSF would then allow 22 more passenger trains per day for Northstar, NLX, Amtrak, and possibly other services.  The Northstar's Fridley station was built with the future third main in mind, and was initially built as an island platform with track only on the east side, requiring the Northstar train to be on that track when traveling inbound to or outbound from Minneapolis.

Stations list

References

External links
 Northern Lights Express

Transportation in Minneapolis–Saint Paul
Passenger rail transportation in Minnesota
Transportation in Wisconsin
Proposed railway lines in Minnesota
Transportation in Pine County, Minnesota
Higher-speed rail
Proposed Amtrak routes